Nazmi Nidal Nazmi Albadawi (born August 24, 1991) is a former Palestinian professional footballer who recently played as a midfielder for North Carolina FC and the Palestine national team.

Early life
Albadawi played club soccer for Triangle United Soccer Association, where he contributed to 3 consecutive USYSA Region III Championships from 2008 to 2010.

He played high school soccer for the Athens Drive High School Jaguars of Raleigh, North Carolina. He was a four-year letter winner, winning all-conference selection three times and all-region honors as a senior. He finished his high school career with 35 goals and 60 assists in 88 games.

College career
Albadawi played four years of college soccer at NC State between 2010 and 2013 and prior to that a year at Wake Technical Community College. On November 9, 2013, he scored a game-winner in overtime against in-state rivals UNC.

While at college, Albadawi appeared for NPSL club Carolina RailHawks U-23's in 2012 and 2013.

Club career

Carolina Railhawks/North Carolina FC
Albadawi signed with NASL club Carolina RailHawks on April 11, 2014. On May 28, he netted his first career goal in a 2–0 win over the Charlotte Eagles in the second round of the Lamar Hunt U.S Open Cup. On October 12, he was named NASL player of the week after scoring one goal and one assist in a win against the San Antonio Scorpions. On December 1, the RailHawks picked up his contract option for the 2015 season. On January 12, 2016 the RailHawks announced that Albadawi had been re-signed to a multi-year contract. During the 2016 season, Albadawi started 29 games for the RailHawks, scoring three goals and breaking the NASL single-season assist record with 10. Following the season, he was named to the NASL Best XI.

Prior to the 2017 NASL season, Albadawi trained with Croatian First Football League side NK Istra 1961.

FC Cincinnati
On January 15, 2018, Albadawi signed with USL side FC Cincinnati on a multi-year contract. After playing one game for Cincinnati during their inaugural MLS season in 2019, he was loaned back to North Carolina FC on May 30.

Return to North Carolina FC
On November 21, 2019, he re-signed with North Carolina FC for the 2020 season.
 
On September 3, 2021, Albadawi announced his retirement from professional soccer. On September 13, 2021, Albadawi was named USL League One Player of the Week for Week 23 of the 2021 season after scoring a brace against New England Revolution II in his final professional game.

International career
Albadawi played his first international match for Palestine in a friendly against Pakistan that ended with a 2–1 win, scoring the winning goal.

Personal life
Albadawi's family hails from Tarshiha. He is a Muslim, stating in 2019: "I've grown a lot in faith the last couple years and it's something that's been very important to me."

Career statistics

International 
Scores and results list Palestine's goal tally first.

References

External links

 
 
 

1991 births
Living people
Palestinian footballers
Palestine international footballers
American soccer players
American people of Palestinian descent
NC State Wolfpack men's soccer players
Carolina RailHawks NPSL players
North Carolina FC players
Athens Drive High School alumni
Association football midfielders
Soccer players from Raleigh, North Carolina
North American Soccer League players
2019 AFC Asian Cup players
FC Cincinnati players
FC Cincinnati (2016–18) players
USL Championship players
Major League Soccer players
Soccer players from North Carolina